Caine Road is a road running through Mid-Levels, Hong Kong. It connects Bonham Road to the west (at the junction with Hospital Road and Seymour Road), and Arbuthnot Road, Glenealy and Upper Albert Road to the east.

The road is named after William Caine, a Colonial Secretary, and an acting Governor of Hong Kong between May and September 1859.

History
From 1862–1865 during the American Civil War, Caine Road was home to Sara Delano, President of the United States Franklin D. Roosevelt's mother whose family had a permanent residence at Rose Hill on Caine Road (currently standing near the Immaculate Conception Cathedral of Hong Kong) through their connection to the American trading house Russell & Company.

In the afternoon of December 15, 1941, during the Battle of Hong Kong, a stick Japanese bombs hit the junction of Old Bailey Street and Caine Road, the junction of Pottinger Street and Hollywood Road, Wellington Street and the Central Police Station. The bombing was part of a systematic bombardment of the Hong Kong Island's north shore that was launched on that day.

Features
The following major buildings and structures are located along Caine Road:
 Gateposts of Albron Court, mansion built in the 1870s for businessman Hormusjee Naorojee Mody
Kom Tong Hall
 Caritas Institute of Higher Education
 Immaculate Conception Cathedral of Hong Kong
 Old Pathological Institute, currently the Hong Kong Museum of Medical Sciences, behind which an alley called Caine Lane is located

Transport
From 7am to 7pm during weekdays, driving west-bound from Upper Albert Road is reserved for buses only. Private vehicles may drive west between 7pm and 7am weekdays, after 1pm on Saturdays, and all day on Sundays.

Public bus services 12, 12M, 13, 23, 23B, 40, 40M and 103 pass through this road.

See also
List of streets and roads in Hong Kong

References

External links

Google Maps of Caine Road

Mid-Levels
Roads on Hong Kong Island